The siege of Soyapango is an ongoing Salvadoran government operation to arrest criminal gang members of Mara Salvatrucha (MS-13) and 18th Street gang in the city of Soyapango. The operation has been ongoing since 3 December 2022, when Salvadoran President Nayib Bukele announced that 10,000 members of the country's security forces surrounded the city. As of 6 December 2022, a total of 185 alleged gang members have been arrested.

Background 

On 27 March 2022, the Salvadoran government declared a state of emergency following a spike in murders which resulted in 87 deaths between 25 and 27 March. From March 2022 to November 2022, the government arrested a total of 58,096 people with alleged affiliations to the country's two largest criminal gangs: Mara Salvatrucha (MS-13) and 18th Street gang. The gang crackdown was criticized by foreign governments and human rights groups, claiming that the government was violating human rights and utilizing arbitrary arrests.

Operation 

On 3 December 2022, Salvadoran President Nayib Bukele announced that 10,000 members of the country's security forces, composing of 8,500 soldiers and 1,500 police officers, surrounded the city of Soyapango with the goal of arresting every gang member in the city. The soldiers blocked roads and searched homes for gang members, as well as checking identity documents from anyone leaving the city. According to René Merino Monroy, the Minister of National Defense, a total of 185 people were arrested within the first three days of the operation.

Reactions 

Residents of Soyapango reportedly supported the operation.

References

Further reading 

 
 

2022 in El Salvador
December 2022 events in North America
Organized crime conflicts
MS-13
Gangs in El Salvador